Telus Sky, (also stylized as TELUS Sky) is a 59-storey,  mixed-use skyscraper in downtown Calgary, Alberta, Canada. At completion in 2019, the structure building became the third-tallest building in Calgary behind Brookfield Place East and The Bow. As of July 2020, Telus Sky is the 18th tallest building in Canada, though several buildings in Toronto exceeding its height are under construction including The One. 

Telus Sky incorporates  of mixed-use area available.

History
On July 4, 2013, the Telus Corporation announced the development of the $400-million ($-million in ) Telus Sky, designed by the architectural firms Bjarke Ingels Group and Dialog, which promised to provide a new architectural landmark to Calgary's Downtown to be completed in 2017. The announcement included plans for a  mixed-use tower to incorporate office, retail and residential space. Of which there was to be 26 floors totaling  of office space with Telus reserving . The design included LEED Platinum status and a number of sustainable design features including a storm water management system, and a  public gallery.

The building was designed with a clean rectangular base and bottom floors for efficient open-office layouts, and as the building rises, the floor plates slowly reduce in size and pixilate creating small balconies and terraces.

Prior the construction of Telus Sky, the corner of 7 Avenue & Centre St SW was home to a three-storey building constructed in 1928 and hosted Art Central, a place where local artists could create and showcase their talent in small galleries and studios. The building was demolished in November 2014.

Construction on Telus Sky started in February 2015.

Construction of the Telus Sky continued past the original completion date of 2017, with delays causing construction to continue into 2019. The first commercial tenants were scheduled to move in July 2019 and the residential rental suites received bookings for September 2019.

Public Art

Telus Sky's northern and southern facades are clad in a dynamic LED display dubbed "Northern Lights", designed by Canadian artist Douglas Coupland, which is one of the largest public art fixtures in Canada.

The LED light strips that make up the art piece are equipped with an infinite number of colour shades and combinations. The Northern Lights display will go through five 12-minute sequences per hour. With the starting sequence always being a mimic of the world famous aurora borealis, and the remaining four sequences to be interchangeable. The public art features an interactive smartphone app that will give users information about what inspired the current pattern at any given sequence, and will be online from sunrise to sunset, 365 days a year. The Northern Lights display was first previewed on April 19, 2019.

Building details

The developers of Telus Sky are striving to achieve LEED Platinum certification for the office, retail, and art spaces of the building, with the residential levels being targeted for LEED Gold. This will make Telus Sky the most environmentally sustainable building in Canada over 200 meters in height.

Square footage of:
The entire building: 
The office space:  on 29 floors
The residential space:  on floors 30-58
The retail space:  located mainly on the ground level
Total leased space: 
Art space: 
Number of storeys: 60
Listing Agency: Colliers International

Tenants
Following the collapse in oil prices in 2015, the Calgary real-estate market began to suffer from growing vacant downtown office space, which Telus Sky has not been immune. As of April 2020, Telus Sky has an occupancy level of 60%, which is split among five commercial tenants, of which the Telus Corporation represents  or 33% of the occupancy.

Tenants include:
The Telus Corporation - 
Absorb Software -

Construction

See also
List of tallest buildings in Calgary

References

External links 

Telus Sky official website

Telus
Buildings and structures in Calgary
Bjarke Ingels buildings
Skyscrapers in Calgary
Twisted buildings and structures
Skyscraper office buildings in Canada
Residential skyscrapers in Canada
Retail buildings in Canada